The 2006–07 SIJHL season is the 6th season of the Superior International Junior Hockey League (SIJHL). The six teams of the SIJHL will play 50-game schedules.

Come February, the top teams of the league will play down for the Bill Salonen Cup, the SIJHL championship.  The winner of the Bill Salonen Cup will compete in the Central Canadian Junior "A" championship, the Dudley Hewitt Cup.  If successful against the winners of the Ontario Junior Hockey League and Northern Ontario Junior Hockey League, the champion would then move on to play in the Canadian Junior Hockey League championship, the 2007 Royal Bank Cup.

Changes 
Marathon Renegades join league.
Thunder Bay Golden Hawks become Thunder Bay Bearcats.
Minot State University-Bottineau Lumberjacks discontinue part-time status with league.

Final standings
Note: GP = Games played; W = Wins; L = Losses; OTL = Overtime losses; SL = Shootout losses; GF = Goals for; GA = Goals against; PTS = Points; x = clinched playoff berth; y = clinched division title; z = clinched conference title

Teams listed on the official league website.

Standings listed on official league website.

2006-07 Bill Salonen Cup Playoffs

Playoff results are listed on the official league website.

Dudley Hewitt Cup Championship
Hosted by the Abitibi Eskimos in Iroquois Falls, Ontario.  Schreiber finished in second place.

Round Robin
Schreiber Diesels 5 - Abitibi Eskimos (NOJHL) 4
Aurora Tigers (OPJHL) 6 - Schreiber Diesels 3
Soo Indians (NOJHL) 2 - Schreiber Diesels 1

Semi-final
Schreiber Diesels 6 - Abitibi Eskimos (NOJHL) 5 2OT

Final
Aurora Tigers (OPJHL) 10 - Schreiber Diesels 0

Scoring leaders 
Note: GP = Games played; G = Goals; A = Assists; Pts = Points; PIM = Penalty minutes

Leading goaltenders 
Note: GP = Games played; Mins = Minutes played; W = Wins; L = Losses: OTL = Overtime losses; SL = Shootout losses; GA = Goals Allowed; SO = Shutouts; GAA = Goals against average

Awards
Most Valuable Player -
Most Improved Player -
Rookie of the Year -
Top Defenceman -
Top Defensive Forward - Jason MacMillan
Most Gentlemanly Player -
Top Goaltender -
Coach of the Year -
Top Scorer Award -
Top Executive -

See also 
 2007 Royal Bank Cup
 Dudley Hewitt Cup

References

External links 
 Official website of the Superior International Junior Hockey League
 Official website of the Canadian Junior Hockey League

Superior International Junior Hockey League seasons
SIJHL